Biška Vas is a village in the Municipality of Mirna Peč in southeastern Slovenia. It lies on the Temenica River north of Mirna Peč. The area is part of the traditional region of Lower Carniola. The municipality is now included in the Southeast Slovenia Statistical Region.

Name
Biška Vas was attested in historical sources as Visezdorf in 1343, Vilessendorf in 1351, Swysitschdorff in 1420, and Wissestorff in 1433, among other spellings.

References

External links
Biška Vas on Geopedia

Populated places in the Municipality of Mirna Peč